The term Ghost Castle could refer to: 

Ghost Castle, British variant of the board game Which Witch?
Tales of Ghost Castle, a 1975 horror anthology comic book series published by DC Comics

See also
Ghost in the Castle, a 1947 German comedy horror film